"The Doll" is the 127th episode of NBC sitcom Seinfeld. This is the 17th episode for the seventh season, originally airing on February 22, 1996.

In this episode, George is troubled by a doll belonging to his fiance Susan which looks like his mother, Elaine tries to reconcile with her conductor boyfriend by getting him José Carreras' autograph, Frank recognizes a long lost cousin in a photo Elaine took in Tuscany, and George and Susan try to fix Jerry up with Sally Weaver, inconveniencing him when she keeps on bringing the wrong props for an upcoming TV show appearance.

Plot
While performing in Memphis, Jerry meets Susan's old roommate, Sally Weaver, who gives him a large wedding present to deliver to George and Susan. While on the plane, Jerry, because he has to be careful with the package, insists on holding it in his lap, so a flight attendant carelessly stuffs his own bag into the overhead compartment, breaking a bottle of barbecue sauce that he was going to use for his material on Charles Grodin's television show. He is incensed at Sally when George opens the gift to reveal a welcome mat a fraction of the size of the package it came in and mentions that Sally is an executive for Federal Express, meaning she could have just shipped the mat.

Frank Costanza turns George's old bedroom into a billiard room.  Elaine tells Frank about a photo she took of a man in front of a sign saying "Costanza" in Tuscany. Frank thinks this might be his long lost cousin Carlo and wants to get the photo. Elaine says the Maestro might have a copy; he hasn't contacted her since they returned from Tuscany because she spilled wine on his autographed poster of José Carreras. Frank and Kramer visit the Maestro, who shows them an old conductor's trick: he takes off his pants when he sits down so he doesn't lose the crease. Later he goes to play billiards with Kramer and Frank and shows Frank the picture. Temporarily excusing himself, he leaves his conductor's baton, which Kramer then uses as a pool stick since George's room is too small to play in with the standard cues.

At the Costanza/Ross residence, Susan unpacks her doll collection, including one that looks exactly like George's mother. While Susan denies the resemblance, George is unable to sleep when Susan takes the doll to bed with them. He shows it to Jerry.

Sally is coming to New York to visit Susan. His fury increased at the discovery that Sally could have brought the mat herself, Jerry asks her to bring him a case of the barbecue sauce he wanted for his act. However, this fails to similarly inconvenience her when she gets an empty seat next to her on the plane, and she brings him a different barbecue sauce, claiming that this sauce is much better. Elaine discovers that José Carreras will be appearing on "The Charles Grodin Show" with Jerry and accompanies Jerry to the show to get his autograph. She must lug the poster and an Oro-Dent electric toothbrush (in a large box) given to her by Jerry across town. She gets coffee spilled on her but makes it with the poster undamaged and gives it to the Maestro. He loves it, but after he leaves Elaine picks up the Oro-Dent box, knocking over a wine bottle and ruining the poster again. The Maestro's concert is ruined because his baton was bent when Kramer used it to play pool.

Jerry plans to use the Estelle doll as his material for the show. The only person at home when he calls is Sally. She brings the wrong doll, saying that the one she brought is much funnier. Carreras wipes his mouth with Jerry's pants after he took them off doing the trick he learned from Kramer. Jerry receives his cue to go on stage, with no material and spaghetti sauce stained pants.

Frank stops by George's place to show him the picture he got from the Maestro of the man in Tuscany he believes to be his cousin. When Frank sees the doll, he begins to hear his wife's voice and goes crazy, grabbing it out of Susan's hands and beheading it. Frank goes to Tuscany to meet his supposed cousin. However, the man reveals that his name is Giuseppe. Frank shrugs and leaves, carrying a present for Carlo in a large box much like Jerry and Elaine carried earlier.

Production 
When the episode's script was brought to the read-through, it was titled "The Doormat", and included a plotline in which Elaine's portrait is painted in pastels. Elaine thinks the artist painted it because he is infatuated with her, but he then sells the portrait to Frank Costanza, who puts it in the pool room. While the Maestro is playing pool with Frank and Kramer, he backs into the portrait, imprinting the image of Elaine's face onto his underwear. The script underwent significant rewriting after the read-through. In particular, show creators Larry David and Jerry Seinfeld felt the portrait of Elaine story was too complicated, and replaced it with the José Carreras story. David also tweaked the George story, coming up with the idea of a doll that looks like George's mother; in the original script, George was disturbed because Susan had a creepy-looking doll collection, with no individual doll standing out.

Writers Tom Gammill and Max Pross encountered the practice of wearing no pants before a show in order to maintain the crease while visiting their friend Sam Denoff backstage with Jerry Lewis. Gamill and Pross came up with Jerry's predicament in the episode because they were amused by the idea of Seinfeld, who in real life fastidiously prepared for every show, having no material ready out of apparent laziness. The resolution to Jerry's story was filmed but deleted due to episode length constraints. In the unused climactic scene, Jerry is inspired to go on stage without his pants and tell the story of why he is not wearing any pants, which earns tremendous laughs from the audience. Other cut scenes include George awkwardly confronting his mother after sleeping with the doll, and Frank carrying his large package for Carlo on the flight to Tuscany, making the passenger beside him uncomfortable. The latter scene also revealed the contents of the package; Frank was re-gifting the doormat.

According to Gammill and Pross, most guest stars on Seinfeld kept a polite distance from the regular cast during production, but Kathy Griffin would freely, and sometimes loudly, engage the show's stars in conversation. Griffin later performed a stand-up comedy routine alleging that Jerry Seinfeld was rude to her during filming. Seinfeld was so amused by this he had it written into a later episode, "The Cartoon", where Griffin returned as Sally Weaver.

References

External links
 

Seinfeld (season 7) episodes
1996 American television episodes
Dolls in fiction